RCA Music Group was an umbrella group of labels distributed by Sony Music Entertainment that existed between March 2004 and 2009, and for a short period of time between July 2011 and October 2011 as all RCA Music Group labels were merged with RCA Records.

History

Inception
RCA Music Group was created by BMG in March 2004 shortly after the formation of Zomba Label Group. It became a part of the BMG Label Group along with Zomba. In 2008, BMG sold their half of the Sony BMG merger back to Sony, but retained the use of the BMG name. Thus, in early 2009, the BMG Label Group was rebranded to the RCA/JIVE Label Group, half of which was the RCA Music Group. Zomba was also rebranded to become the JIVE Label Group.

2011 Restructuring
In mid-2011, Sony announced that they were again restructuring RCA/JIVE Label Group.  The JIVE side split, and LA Reid was hired to head Epic Records, which was restructured to focus on urban music. JIVE Records was moved under RCA Music Group, minus those artists who were moved to Epic. Some of JIVE's urban artists such as Usher moved to RCA, while other JIVE pop artists, including Britney Spears & P!nk, stayed under JIVE as the label moved under the RCA Music Group. Peter Edge serves as CEO of the company. The company was expected to start releasing all of its recordings under RCA Records. Arista Records, J Records and JIVE Records have been shut down in October 2011 with all of their artists moving to RCA. In August 2011, RCA laid off 20 members of its staff.

Labels

RCA Records
Arista Records
LaFace Records 
J Records
Jive Records

Leadership

Peter Edge: Chairman & CEO
Tom Corson: President & COO

See also
RCA/JIVE Label Group
Epic Records
Columbia Records

References

Sony Music
Record labels established in 2004
Record labels disestablished in 2009
Record labels established in 2011
Re-established companies
Record labels disestablished in 2011